John Chessell Buckler (8 December 1793 – 10 January 1894) was a British architect,  the eldest son of the architect John Buckler. J. C. Buckler initially worked with his father before taking over his practice. His work included restorations of country houses and at the University of Oxford.

Career

Buckler received art lessons from the painter Francis Nicholson.  From 1810 onwards he worked with his father. His younger brother, George, later joined them and reported that the three worked "in perfect harmony". In 1830 his father handed over his architectural practice to him, and  he worked in partnership with George until 1842.

In 1825 Buckler began rebuilding Costessey Hall, Norfolk, for Lord Stafford. His work there was  described by Charles Locke Eastlake, writing in 1872, as "one of the most important and successful instances of the  [Gothic] Revival in Domestic Architecture". The new buildings formed an irregular picturesque group, with stepped gables, angle turrets and  richly moulded chimney-shafts, exhibiting, according to Eastlake " a knowledge of detail and proportion far in advance of contemporary work".

Buckler did a lot of work in Oxford, carrying out repairs and additions to  St. Mary's Church,  and Oriel, Brasenose, Magdalen, and  Jesus  Colleges. He also restored Oxburgh Hall, Norfolk, and Hengrave Hall, Suffolk, and designed Dunston Hall, Norfolk, and Butleigh Court  in Somerset.

In 1836 he came second, behind Charles Barry, in the competition to rebuild the Palace of Westminster following its destruction by fire.

Buckler's writings included the text accompanying his father's engravings of  Views of the Cathedral Churches of England and Wales (1822). In 1823 he published Observations on the Original Architecture of St. Mary Magdalen College, Oxford, in which he expressed his hostility towards changes in the quadrangle of Magdalen College. Some of his later writings, such as A History of the Architecture of the Abbey Church of St Alban (1847), were in collaboration with his own son, Charles Alban Buckler. He wrote a further polemical work, A Description And Defense Of The Restorations Of The Exterior Of Lincoln Cathedral (1866), a scathing response to accusations that, in capacity as honorary architect to Lincoln Cathedral, he had overseen a damaging restoration involving the 'scraping' of the cathedral fabric.

He died, aged 100, on 10 January 1894.

Works
Buildings that he designed or restored include:
Costessey Hall, Norfolk, 1826
St. Mary's parish church, Adderbury, Oxfordshire: restoration of chancel, 1831–34
St. Nicholas' parish church, Old Shoreham, West Sussex: restoration of chancel, 1839–40
Butleigh Court, Somerset, 1845
Church Of St Leonard, Butleigh, Somerset.
schoolroom at Magdalen College, Oxford, 1849–51 (now a library)
St. Mary's parish church, Steeple Barton, Oxfordshire: rebuilding, 1850
St. Mary the Virgin parish church, Lower Swell, Gloucestershire: rebuilt nave, 1852
St. Mary's parish church, Pyrton, Oxfordshire: rebuilding, 1856
Dunston Hall, Norfolk, 1859 onwards
Lincoln Cathedral
Oxburgh Hall, Norfolk

Buckler's restorations at the University of Oxford include:
the University Church of St Mary the Virgin and
Jesus College, Oxford.

See also
Buildings of Jesus College, Oxford

Unbuilt Proposals

Kilronan Castle, Keadue, Co. Roscommon, Ireland.

References

Sources

External links
 
 

1793 births
1894 deaths
English centenarians
Men centenarians
English ecclesiastical architects
Architects of cathedrals
19th-century English architects